Ross Island is an island in City of Townsville, Queensland, Australia.

Geography
Ross Island is the land that lies between Ross Creek and Ross River and the Coral Sea. Ross Creek is itself a small estuarine portion of the Ross River which creates a bay inlet at the Coral Sea. Ross Island is divided into two suburbs of Townsville: South Townsville on the north of the island and Railway Estate on the south of the island.

History 
Ross Island is named after William Alfred Ross, European pioneer of the Townsville area and its first publican.

References

Islands of Queensland
City of Townsville